In the run up to the 2021 Norwegian parliamentary election, various organisations carried out opinion polling to gauge voting intention in Norway. Results of such polls are displayed in this article.

The date range for these opinion polls are from the previous general election, held on 11 September 2017, to 13 September 2021, the day of the election. Unlike most nations, Norway's constitution does not allow early elections before the four-year term limit.

Poll results

Graphical summary 
There are several websites tracking party support ahead of the election, using somewhat different methods. Below is a plot of the 30-day moving average of relevant opinion polls.

2021

2020

2019

2018

2017

By county

Akershus

Aust-Agder

Buskerud

Finnmark

Hedmark

Hordaland

Møre og Romsdal

Nord-Trøndelag

Nordland

Oppland

Oslo

Rogaland

Sogn og Fjordane

Sør-Trøndelag

Telemark

Troms

Vest-Agder

Vestfold

Østfold

See also 
Opinion polling for the 2017 Norwegian parliamentary election

References 

List of polls on pollofpolls.no 

Opinion polling in Norway